Simonds Parish, New Brunswick may refer to:

Simonds Parish, Carleton County, New Brunswick
Simonds Parish, Saint John County, New Brunswick